

People with the given name
Dinu Brătianu (1866–1951), Romanian politician
Dinu Cocea (1929–2013), Romanian actor, film director and screenwriter
Dinu Ghezzo (1941–2011), Romanian conductor
Dinu C. Giurescu (born 1927), Romanian historian and politician
Dinu Graur (born 1994), Moldovan footballer
Dinu Grigoresco (1914–2001), Romanian-French painter
Dinu Li, British artist
Dinu Lipatti (1917–1950), Romanian classical pianist and composer
Dinu Moldovan (born 1990), Romanian footballer
Dinu Nicodin (1886–1948), Romanian writer
Dinu Negreanu (1917–2001), Romanian film director
Dinu Patriciu (1950–2014), Romanian businessman and politician
Dinu Pescariu (born 1974), Romanian tennis player
Dinu Pillat (1921–1975), Romanian literary critic and writer
Dinu Sănmărtean (born 1981), Romanian footballer
Dinu Săraru (born 1932), Romanian novelist and playwright
Dinu Solanki (born 1958),Indian politician from  Gujarat
 Dinu Thakur, Indian Bengali musician and singer
Dinu Todoran (born 1978), Romanian footballer

People with the surname
Bogdan Dinu (born 1986), Romanian boxer 
Ciprian Dinu (born 1982), Romanian footballer
Cornel Dinu (born 1948), Romanian footballer
Cristea Dinu (1911–1991), Romanian long-distance runner
Cristina Dinu (born 1993), Romanian tennis player
 Gheorghe Dinu (1904–1974), Romanian poet, editor, film critic, and communist militant
Loredana Dinu (born 1984), Romanian fencer
Luminița Dinu (born 1971), Romanian handball player
Marcel Dinu (born 1935), Romanian diplomat
Marian Dinu (born 1965), Romanian football player and coach
Medi Dinu (1909–2016), Romanian classical painter
Robert Dinu (born 1974), Romanian water polo player
Viorel Dinu (born 1980), Romanian footballer

Romanian-language surnames
Romanian masculine given names